Resident Evil: Resistance is a 2020 survival horror game developed by NeoBards Entertainment and published by Capcom as the online component for Resident Evil 3. Released for PlayStation 4, Windows, and Xbox One, it involves four survivor players competing against a mastermind player who can create traps, enemies and other hazards. The game received mixed reviews from critics, who criticized the game for being unbalanced, having technical issues and for lacking dedicated servers.

Gameplay
Resident Evil: Resistance is a survival horror game that puts a team of four survivor players against a mastermind player who can create traps, enemies, and other hazards.

The game takes place in 1998 just before or during the Raccoon City Destruction Incident, where civilians have been abducted by the Umbrella Intelligence Division. Sent to the "NEST2" facility, they are forced to fight a number of mutants on behalf of senior Umbrella employees to prove the effectiveness of Umbrella's t-Virus project.

Survivors
 Samuel Jordan (voiced by Clayton Froning) - A boxer that was forced into retirement after an injury. He signed up for a medical trial at Umbrella Pharmaceuticals, hoping to return to boxing. Instead, he was taken to NEST2 for B.O.W testing.
 Valerie Harmon (voiced by Alex Ryan) - A chemistry student at Raccoon University. Valerie was an intern at the NEST2 lab while taking her Masters course. She was investigating her roommate's mysterious memory problems. She caught the attention of Umbrella and was abducted to participate in experiments.
 Tyrone Henry (voiced by John Eric Bentley) - A firefighter for the Raccoon City Fire Department. He was taken to NEST2 after he responded to a fire at an Umbrella USA facility.
 January Van Sant (voiced by Melanie Minichino) - A computer hacker that was commissioned to find information about the relationship between Umbrella USA and the Raccoon City Police Department. After being discovered, she was kidnapped by Umbrella and brought to NEST2.
 Becca Woolett (voiced by Tara Sands) - A Park Ranger who grew up in the outskirts of Arklay County. She was called out to investigate screaming by the Marble River. Becca was attacked by a pack of Cerberus, one of Umbrella's B.O.W.s. She survived her attack and was taken by Umbrella to the NEST2 facility. 
 Martin Sandwich (voiced by Nicolas Roye) - A mechanic working for an unnamed medical appliance company. While doing repairs at Spencer Memorial Hospital, he accidentally saw the Umbrella testing facility hidden there. He was abducted afterwards to become a test subject at NEST2.
 Jill Valentine (voiced by Nicole Tompkins) - After being suspended by her R.P.D supervisor for investigating Umbrella's illegal activities, Jill begins to have horrific "dreams" where she and other survivors encounter unfathomable terrors. Jill gradually realizes that these nightmares are actually real.

Masterminds
 Daniel Fabron (voiced by Kaiser Johnson) - An intelligence division member and colleague of Dr. Alex Wesker. With her help, his job is to eliminate threats to the company.
 Alex Wesker (voiced by Mary Elizabeth McGlynn) - Chief researcher, Alex finds subjects and carries out the experiments, reporting her findings to Ozwell E. Spencer.
  Annette Birkin (voiced by Karen Strassman) - A virologist, Annette Birkin was brought on board by Alex Wesker after significant contributions to the G-Virus research.
 Ozwell E. Spencer (voiced by Time Winters) - One of the founders of Umbrella, Ozwell E. Spencer refuses to face his own mortality. He was intrigued by Alex's reports of a virus mutation that grants superhuman abilities without altering the subject's physiology and decided to take part in the experiments himself.
 Nicholai Ginovaef (voiced by Neil Newbon) - Nicholai Ginovaef's incent for participating in these experiments is strictly monetary. His experience as a mercenary forged him into a skilled marksman and shrewd opportunist. Even if the survivors manage to escape his arsenal, they will soon be hunted down by the ever-persistent Nemesis.

Development and release
Resistance is the first project developed by NeoBards Entertainment. Although the studio was formed in 2017, many of its staff members had previously worked on various projects with Capcom, including Onimusha: Warlords. Development of the game started in 2017 by a team of roughly 120 people, who were based in two offices in Taipei and Suzhou. The idea of having a mastermind player using security cameras to view survivor players was inspired by the fixed camera angles of the first Resident Evil games. The game runs on Capcom's proprietary RE Engine. It was announced at the 2019 Tokyo Game Show as Project Resistance. A beta was released on Steam and PlayStation 4 on March 31, 2020.

Resistance was bundled with the Resident Evil 3 remake and released on April 3, 2020 because Capcom felt that Resident Evil 3 on its own does not have as much content as the Resident Evil 2 remake. Capcom supported the game with additional updates and downloadable content until July 2020. These include the option for survivor players to play as Jill Valentine and a new costume pack which allows survivor players to dress up as Leon S. Kennedy and Claire Redfield from the Resident Evil 2 remake. Another update introduced the character of Nicholai Ginovaef as a mastermind, allowing players to summon and control Nemesis. Nicholai had been considered a candidate since the early stages of development. A patch that focused on balance adjustments was released on June 19, 2020. Support for the game ended with the final patch released on October 8, 2020.

Reception

Resistance received "mixed or average reviews" from critics. IGN criticized the game for being unbalanced and for lacking visual diversity. Shacknews criticized the game's poor connection quality because it does not have its own dedicated servers. Instead, the player who plays as the mastermind is the host of the game, resulting in the survivor players being at the mercy of the quality of the mastermind's connection. A large number of technical issues were also identified, which were said to make the game almost unplayable. Stutter and the fact it takes almost three seconds for enemies to react after being shot were highlighted as some of the most common issues. Wccftech editor Nathan Birch criticized the game's inclusion of microtransactions and loot boxes.

Notes

References

External links
 

2020 video games
Bioterrorism in fiction
Capcom games
Fiction about parasites
2020s horror video games
Multiplayer video games
Mutants in fiction
PlayStation 4 games
PlayStation 4 Pro enhanced games
Resident Evil spin-off games
Science fiction video games
Survival video games
Third-person shooters
Video games about zombies
Video games about viral outbreaks
Video games developed in China
Video games developed in Taiwan
Video games set in 1998
Windows games
Xbox One games
Xbox One X enhanced games